is an interchange railway station in Toyohashi, Aichi, Japan, operated by Central Japan Railway Company (JR Tōkai) and the private railway operator Nagoya Railroad (Meitetsu).

Lines
Toyohashi Station is served by the high-speed Tokaido Shinkansen, and the conventional Tokaido Main Line operated by JR Central. It is 293.6 kilometers from Tokyo Station. It is also the southern terminus of the Iida Line and is 129.3 kilometers form the northern terminus at Iida Station. The station is also a terminus for the 99.8 kilometer Meitetsu Nagoya Main Line.

Toyohashi Railroad has two small stations close to Toyohashi Station: Shin-Toyohashi Station for the Atsumi Line railway and Ekimae Station for the Azumada Main Line tramway, but these stations are not physically connected to Toyohashi Station.

Layout

Local train services at Toyohashi Station are handled by five platforms serving eight tracks. The Iida Line and Meitetsu lines use three tracks terminating in a bay platform. The Tokaido Main Line uses a side platform and two island platforms. The elevated Shinkansen portion of Toyohashi Station has a side platform and an island platform.

Platforms

Adjacent stations

History
Toyohashi Station opened 1 September 1888. The privately owned Toyokawa Railway began operations to Toyohashi on 15 July 15 1897, but renamed its terminus  in 1899 to differentiate itself from the government railway system. The station building was rebuilt in 1916 and again in 1927. The Aichi Electric Railway's Toyohashi Line began operations to the Yoshida Station side of the facility on 1 June 1927. This line became part of Meitetsu on 1 August 11935, and is now the Nagoya Main Line. The Toyokawa Railway was nationalized on 1 August 1943, becoming the Iida Line, and the usage of ‘Yoshida Station’ was dropped. The station was destroyed in the Toyohashi Air Raid of 20 June 1945, during World War II.

After the war, the JGR became the Japanese National Railways (JNR), and a new station was completed in 1950. The Tokaido Shinkansen opened on 1 October 1964. A new station building was completed in 1970.

With the privatization and dissolution of JNR on 1 April 1987, the station came under the control of JR Central. A shopping center and a hotel were added to the station building complex in 1997.

Station numbering was introduced to the section of the Tōkaidō Line operated JR Central as well as the Iida Line in March 2018; Toyohashi Station was assigned station number CA42 for the Tōkaidō Line and CD00 for the Iida Line.

Passenger statistics
In fiscal 2017, the JR portion of the station was used by an average of 29,045 passengers daily (arriving passengers only) and the Meitetsu portion by 17,479.

See also
 List of railway stations in Japan

References

Yoshikawa, Fumio. Tokaido-sen 130-nen no ayumi. Grand-Prix Publishing (2002) .

External links

JR Central station information 
Meitetsu Station information 

Railway stations in Aichi Prefecture
Railway stations in Japan opened in 1888
Central Japan Railway Company
Tōkaidō Main Line
Iida Line
Stations of Nagoya Railroad
Toyohashi